"May You Never Be Alone" is a song written and recorded by Hank Williams.  It was released as the flipside of "I Just Don't Like This Kind of Living" in  January 1950.

Background
"May You Never Be Alone" dated back to a 1946 Williams song folio under the title "I Loved No One but You." With its poetic imagery ("Like a bird that's lost its mate in flight," "Like a piece of driftwood on the sea"), the song stands out as one of Williams' first great compositions.  He recorded it with Fred Rose producing at Castle Studio in Nashville on March 1, 1950.  He is backed by Dale Potter (fiddle), Don Davis (steel guitar), Zeke Turner (lead guitar), Clyde Baum (mandolin), Jack Shook (rhythm guitar), and probably Ernie Newton (bass). Clyde Baum plays the only mandolin solo to be ever featured on a Hank Williams record.

Cover versions
Porter Wagoner cut a version of the song.
Wanda Jackson included it on her 1963 album Love Me Forever.
New York City band the Godz covered the song in 1966.
Skeeter Davis covered the song on her 1986 LP She Sings, She Plays.
Emmylou Harris performed the song on the television program In the Hank Williams Tradition.
Willie Nelson and Larry Butler recorded the song as a duet.

References

1949 songs
Hank Williams songs
Songs written by Hank Williams